CHNS may refer to:

 CHNS-FM
 Thiocyanic acid